Charles Adrian Scott Stokes (23 December 1854 – 30 November 1935) was an English landscape painter. Born in Southport, Lancashire, he became a cotton broker in Liverpool, where his artistic talent was noticed by John Herbert RA, who advised him to submit his drawings to the Royal Academy. He entered the Royal Academy Schools in 1872 and exhibited at the Academy from 1876.

Biography

From 1876, travelling to Fontainebleau and Barbizon, he came under the influence of French plein air landscape painters including Jules Bastien-Lepage. He also painted genre works and portraits influenced by Frederic Leighton, John Everett Millais and Parisians such as Pascal Dagnan-Bouveret.

In 1884, he married Austrian artist Marianne Preindlesberger (1855–1927). She became a well-known artist under her married name of Marianne Stokes. The couple spent the summers of 1885 and 1886 at Skagen in the far north of Denmark where there was an artists' colony which became known as the Skagen Painters. There they struck up a close friendship with Michael and Anna Ancher. After an extended stay in France, the couple returned to Britain where they settled in Cornwall at Carbis Bay and joining the artists' colony at St Ives in 1886. The couple travelled frequently to Tyrol and in 1905 to Slovakia. 
In 1905, the couple made their first visit to Hungary, returning in 1907 and 1908.

Adrian Stokes was a landscape painter, concerned most with atmospheric effects, and later with decorative landscapes. He was the author of Landscape Painting (1925). He became ARA in 1909 and RA in 1919, won medals at the Paris Exhibition and Chicago World Fair (1889), became first President of the St Ives Society of Arts (1890) and became Vice President of the Royal Watercolour Society (1932).

Marianne Stokes died during 1927. Adrian Stokes died during 1935. Both were buried at Mortlake Roman Catholic Cemetery, London. An obituary of Adrian Stokes was published in The Times on 2 December 1935.

Paintings

References

Literature

External links
 
 Profile on Royal Academy of Arts Collections
 Stokes, (Charles) Adrian Scott (1854–1935). Magdalen Evans, Oxford Dictionary of National Biography, Oxford University Press, May 2010 , accessed 30 Nov 2010

People from Southport
1854 births
1935 deaths
Royal Academicians
19th-century English painters
English male painters
20th-century English painters
Landscape artists
Artists' Rifles soldiers
St Ives artists
Skagen Painters
19th-century English male artists
20th-century English male artists
Burials at St Mary Magdalen Roman Catholic Church Mortlake